The M32 (formerly the Marstsrom 32) is a class of sailing catamaran designed by Göran Marström and Kåre Ljung and first built in 2010 by Marstrom Composite AB. The design and production rights were sold in 2013 to Aston Harald Composite AB led by Håkan Svensson and run by Killian Bushe.

Design

The M32 is a lightweight, all carbon, high-performance, one-design multihull.  Each of the two hulls - constructed of carbon fiber over a Nomex core - weigh  and feature increased forward buoyancy to reduce nose diving.  The boat weighs  overall and carries a sail area of  resulting in a very high sail area to weight ratio.

The sail plan includes only a high aspect ratio, fully battened mainsail for upwind sailing combined with a furling gennaker for downwind sailing.

Events

World Championship

See also
List of sailing boat types
Similar sailboats
 Extreme 40
 GC32
 Nacra 17
 Tornado (sailboat)

References

External links

Catamarans